Torsten Bréchôt (né Oehmigen, born 11 September 1964 in Schwerin, Bezirk Schwerin) is a retired male judoka from Germany, who competed for East Germany at the 1988 Summer Olympics in Seoul, South Korea. There he won the bronze medal in the Men's Half-Middleweight (– 78 kg) division after being defeated in the semi-finals by West Germany's eventual silver medalist Frank Wieneke.

With a birth name of Oehmigen, he took on his wife's surname in 1985.

References

1964 births
Living people
Sportspeople from Schwerin
People from Bezirk Schwerin
German male judoka
Judoka at the 1988 Summer Olympics
Olympic judoka of East Germany
Olympic bronze medalists for East Germany
Olympic medalists in judo
Medalists at the 1988 Summer Olympics
Recipients of the Patriotic Order of Merit in bronze
20th-century German people